Mazinan (also Romanized as Mazīnān; also known as Darwazān) is a village in Mazinan Rural District, Central District, Davarzan County, Razavi Khorasan Province, Iran. As of the 2006 census, its population was 1,515, in 509 families.

Ali Shariati (1933–1977), born Ali Mazinani, was from this village

References 

Populated places in Davarzan County